The 1967 Allan Cup was the Canadian senior ice hockey championship for the 1966–67 senior "A" season.  The event was hosted byand won bythe Drummondville Eagles in Drummondville, Quebec. The 1967 playoff marked the 59th time that the Allan Cup has been awarded.

Teams
 Drummondville Eagles (Eastern Canadian Champions)
 Calgary Spurs (Western Canadian Champions)

Playdowns

Allan Cup Best-of-Seven Series
Drummondville Eagles 4 - Calgary Spurs 0
Drummondville Eagles 3 - Calgary Spurs 2
Drummondville Eagles 8 - Calgary Spurs 4
Drummondville Eagles 4 - Calgary Spurs 0

Eastern Playdowns
Quarter-final
Moncton Hawks defeated Conception Bay Cee Bees 3-games-to-1
Conception Bay Cee Bees 6 - Moncton Hawks 4
Moncton Hawks 6 - Conception Bay Cee Bees 2
Moncton Hawks 5 - Conception Bay Cee Bees 3
Moncton Hawks 3 - Conception Bay Cee Bees 2
Central Semi-final
Kingston Aces defeated Morrisburg Combines 4-games-to-1
Morrisburg Combines 8 - Kingston Aces 5
Kingston Aces 7 - Morrisburg Combines 5
Kingston Aces 6 - Morrisburg Combines 2
Kingston Aces 8 - Morrisburg Combines 3
Kingston Aces 7 - Morrisburg Combines 6
East Semi-final
Drummondville Eagles defeated Moncton Hawks 3-games-to-none
Drummondville Eagles 3 - Moncton Hawks 2
Drummondville Eagles 9 - Moncton Hawks 0
Drummondville Eagles 6 - Moncton Hawks 4
Final
Drummondville Eagles defeated Kingston Aces 4-games-to-1
Drummondville Eagles 4 - Kingston Aces 1
Drummondville Eagles 5 - Kingston Aces 3
Drummondville Eagles 4 - Kingston Aces 3
Kingston Aces 1 - Drummondville Eagles 0
Drummondville Eagles 3 - Kingston Aces 1

Western Playdowns
Quarter-final
Winnipeg Maroons defeated Port Arthur Bearcats 3-games-to-none
Winnipeg Maroons 7 - Port Arthur Bearcats 2
Winnipeg Maroons 8 - Port Arthur Bearcats 1
Winnipeg Maroons 7 - Port Arthur Bearcats 5 
Pacific Semi-final
Nelson Maple Leafs defeated Drumheller Miners 3-games-to-1
Nelson Maple Leafs 4 - Drumheller Miners 1
Nelson Maple Leafs 4 - Drumheller Miners 1
Drumheller Miners 9 - Nelson Maple Leafs 5
Nelson Maple Leafs 6 - Drumheller Miners 1
West Semi-final
Calgary Spurs defeated Winnipeg Maroons 3-games-to-1
Calgary Spurs 4 - Winnipeg Maroons 2
Calgary Spurs 7 - Winnipeg Maroons 4
Winnipeg Maroons 5 - Calgary Spurs 2
Calgary Spurs 5 - Winnipeg Maroons 0
Final
Calgary Spurs defeated Nelson Maple Leafs 3-games-to-none
Calgary Spurs 5 - Nelson Maple Leafs 3
Calgary Spurs 4 - Nelson Maple Leafs 1
Calgary Spurs 7 - Nelson Maple Leafs 6

External links
Allan Cup archives 
Allan Cup website

Allan Cup
Allan